Back Da-yeon (born 24 January 2002) is a Korean tennis player.

Back has a career-high singles ranking of 580 by the Women's Tennis Association (WTA), achieved on 7 October 2022. She also has a career-high WTA doubles ranking of 563, reached on 14 October 2022.

Back made her WTA Tour debut at the 2022 Korea Open after qualifying for the singles main draw.

ITF Circuit finals

Singles: 2 (1 titles, 1 runner–up)

Doubles: 6 (3 titles, 3 runner–ups)

References

External links

2002 births
Living people
South Korean female tennis players
21st-century South Korean women